Sir Ian Robert McGeechan, OBE (born 30 October 1946) is a retired Scottish rugby union player, coach and teacher.  Born in Leeds, McGeechan represented Headingley as his only club during a 15-year club career, qualifying for Scotland through his father he played 32 times internationally for Scotland over 7 years and won 8 caps on two tours for the British & Irish Lions. During his playing career he worked as a teacher.  Upon retiring from player McGeechan began coaching, in a career spanning 26 years he coached the most recent Scottish side to win a grandslam in the 1990 Five Nations Championship, and won Premiership Rugby & the European Cup with London Wasps in 2008 & 2007.  He was head coach on four tours for the British & Irish Lions spanning 1989 to 2009 and was an assistant to the 2005 tour as well.

Early life
McGeechan was born in Leeds to a Glaswegian father who was in the Argyll and Sutherland Highlanders. He attended West Park County Secondary School and Moor Grange County Secondary School and became Head Boy and trained to be a PE teacher at Carnegie Physical Training College (now part of Leeds Metropolitan University). Although his family mostly played football, he took to rugby while in school.

Playing career
McGeechan played for Headingley and made his debut for Scotland in 1972. He won thirty-two caps, playing at fly-half and centre. He captained Scotland on nine occasions. He toured with the British & Irish Lions in both 1974 and 1977.

Coaching career
In 1986, McGeechan became the assistant Scotland coach to Derrick Grant and in 1988 he was promoted to coach. In 1990 his team won a Grand Slam victory in the Five Nations Championship. His forwards coach and partner was Jim Telfer.

McGeechan was the British & Irish Lions head coach in 1989, 1993, 1997 and 2009. In 2005, he coached the midweek side on the Lions' tour to New Zealand on the invitation of Sir Clive Woodward.

In 1994 McGeechan was appointed as Director of Rugby at Northampton and in 1999 replaced Jim Telfer as Scottish Director of Rugby.

McGeechan was appointed Director of Rugby at London Wasps in 2005 after an unsuccessful and unhappy period as the Scottish Director of Rugby. In his first season of 2005/06 he led Wasps to the Anglo Welsh Cup title, beating Llanelli Scarlets in the final at Twickenham. In his second season, London Wasps claimed the Heineken Cup and in his third season, London Wasps won the Premiership

In February 2010, McGeechan joined the coaching staff at Gloucester as an advisor to Head Coach Bryan Redpath and his coaching team. but moved to local rivals Bath to take up the post of performance director in June 2010.

In 2011 McGeechan took over as the director of rugby at Bath following Steve Meehan's departure.

In July 2012, McGeechan was appointed the executive chairman of Leeds Carnegie.

Coaching statistics

Scotland (1988-1993)

International matches as head coach

Record by country

Scotland (2000-2003)

International matches as head coach 
Note: World Rankings Column shows the World Ranking Scotland was placed at on the following Monday after each of their matches

Record by country

Teaching career
During his coaching career, McGeechan was also a PE teacher for over two decades.

McGeechan taught sport and geography at Fir Tree Middle School and Moor Grange County Secondary School in Leeds.

Honours
McGeechan was knighted in the 2010 New Year Honours for his services to rugby, having previously received an OBE in the 1990 Birthday Honours.

As a player 
 
 Five Nations Championship
 Winner: 1973 (Five-way tie as all teams finished equal on points)
 Runner-up: 1974, 1975
 Calcutta Cup
 Winner: 1974, 1976

As head coach 

  (as Assistant coach)
 Rugby World Cup
 Quarter-finals: 1987
 Five Nations Championship
 Winner: 1986 ( Shared with France )
 Runner-up: 1987 ( equal 2nd with Ireland )
 Calcutta Cup
 Winner: 1986

 
 Rugby World Cup
 Fourth place : 1991
 Quarter-finals : 2003
 Five/Six Nations Championship
 Winner: 1990
 Grand Slam: 1990
 Runner-up: 1989, 1992, 1993
 Third place: 1991, 2001
 Triple Crown
 Winner: 1990
 Calcutta Cup
 Winner: 1989, 1990, 2000
 Centenary Quaich
 Winner: 1989, 1990, 1991, 1992, 1993, 2001

 Northampton Saints
 Premiership Rugby
 Runner-up: 1999
 RFU Championship
 Winner: 1996

 London Wasps
 Premiership Rugby
 Winner: 2008
 Anglo-Welsh Cup
 Winner: 2006
 Heineken Cup
 Winner: 2007

Views
In August 2014, McGeechan was one of 200 public figures who were signatories to a letter to The Guardian expressing their hope that Scotland would vote to remain part of the United Kingdom in September's independence referendum.

References

Bibliography
 Bath, Richard (editor) The Complete Book of Rugby (Seven Oaks, 1997 )
 McGeechan, Ian Lion Man: The Autobiography (Simon and Schuster)

External links
 Sir Ian McGeechan official website

1946 births
Living people
British & Irish Lions coaches
British & Irish Lions rugby union players from Scotland
World Rugby Hall of Fame inductees
Leeds Tykes players
Knights Bachelor
Officers of the Order of the British Empire
People from Headingley
Rugby players and officials awarded knighthoods
Scotland international rugby union players
Scotland national rugby union team coaches
Scottish rugby union coaches
Scottish rugby union players
Rugby union players from Leeds
Yorkshire County RFU players
Rugby union fly-halves